Alberta Provincial Highway No. 22X, commonly referred to as Highway 22X, is a highway in and around Calgary in the Canadian province of Alberta, extending  to the east from Highway 22.  It is concurrent with Stoney Trail (Highway 201) between 53 Street SW and 88 Street SE in Calgary, becoming a freeway and forming the southernmost portion of a ring road around Calgary.

Route description 
Highway 22X begins at Highway 22 near Priddis, running east toward Calgary and at 53 Street SW it becomes concurrent with Stoney Trail (Highway 201). It crosses over Macleod Trail towards the Bow River, then over Deerfoot Trail, and the concurrency ends when Stoney Trail branches north and Highway 22X continues east to its end at Highway 24 east of Calgary, continuing to  Gleichen as Highway 901.

History 

Until it was upgraded in the 2010s as part of the Stoney Trail ring road project, the Marquis of Lorne Trail portion of Highway 22X had earned a reputation of being an accident-prone road. Southward growth of Calgary had turned the small rural highway (it remained a 2-lane rural arterial road for many years) into an urban street that was not suited for high traffic volumes.

Until the late 1990s, all of Highway 22X within the City of Calgary went by the name "Marquis of Lorne Trail" (with the French variant "Marquis de Lorne" used frequently by the city, although signage retained the English version), until the owners of Spruce Meadows successfully lobbied the city to rename the portion west of Macleod Trail after the internationally known show-jumping facility.  That portion of 22X is now known as "Spruce Meadows Trail".  In 2009, the province announced plans to complete the southeastern portion of Stoney Trail south from Highway 1A.  This project included major upgrades to the Marquis of Lorne segment of 22X west from approximately 88th Street to Macleod Trail.  Completed in late 2013, the upgrade resulted in the City renaming Marquis of Lorne Trail west of 88 Street as Stoney Trail and the province also re-designated the highway as Highway 201 (the designation of the rest of Stoney Trail).

Future 
Alberta Transportation has plans for the Highway 22X corridor to eventually be developed into a freeway.

Major intersections

See also 
 Transportation in Calgary

References 

022X
Roads in Calgary